The 2017–18 Oklahoma Sooners women's basketball team represented the University of Oklahoma in the 2017–18 NCAA Division I women's basketball season. The Sooners were led by Sherri Coale in her twenty-second season. The team played its home games at the Lloyd Noble Center in Norman, Oklahoma as a member of the Big 12 Conference. They finished the season 16–15, 11–7 in Big 12 play to finish in a tie for third place. They lost in the quarterfinals of the Big 12 women's tournament to TCU. They received at-large bid of the NCAA women's tournament where they lost to DePaul in the first round.

Roster

Schedule

|-
!colspan=9 style="background:#; color:#FFFDD0;"| Exhibition

|-
!colspan=9 style="background:#; color:#FFFDD0;"| Non-conference regular season

|-
! colspan=9 style="background:#; color:#FFFDD0;"| Big 12 Regular Season

|-
!colspan=9 style="background:#; color:#FFFDD0;"| Big 12 Women's Tournament

|-
!colspan=9 style="background:#; color:#FFFDD0;"| NCAA Women's Tournament

x- Sooner Sports Television (SSTV) is aired locally on Fox Sports. However the contract allows games to air on various affiliates. Those affiliates are FSSW, FSSW+, FSOK, FSOK+, and FCS Atlantic, Central, and Pacific.

Rankings
2017–18 NCAA Division I women's basketball rankings

See also
 2017–18 Oklahoma Sooners men's basketball team

References

External links
Official Athletics Site of the Oklahoma Sooners - Women's Basketball

2017-18
2017–18 Big 12 Conference women's basketball season
2018 in sports in Oklahoma
2017 in sports in Oklahoma
Oklahoma